Gordon and Koppel Field is a former baseball ground located in Kansas City, Missouri. The ground was home to the Kansas City Packers of the Federal League, a third major league in 1914 and 1915. It was also called Gordon and Koppel Stadium, and variously stylized as Gordon & Koppel or Gordon-Koppel.

The local Gordon & Koppel Clothing Company, which included sporting goods among its wares, was operated by Arthur F. Gordon and Hugo M. Koppel, who created the Gordon & Koppel Athletic Company. They opened the multi-purpose Gordon & Koppel Stadium in 1910. Events reported in the local newspapers included baseball, football and track-and-field. The city directory gave Gordon & Koppel Stadium's address as "47th [Street] southeast corner Tracy Avenue."

Prior to the Federal League's arrival, the most important event held at the stadium was probably the November 24, 1910, Kansas vs. Missouri annual rivalry college football game. The game ended in a 5-5 tie. The Kansas players in particular were not happy with the field conditions, saying the surface was too hard and could cause injuries.[Leavenworth Weekly Times, November 24, 1910, p.1] The change in venue gave the annual event a boost, with the highest gate receipts recorded to that point in the series ($34,000).[Atchison Daily Globe, November 25, p.7] This entry in the rivalry series was the last one to be played in Kansas City until 1944.

The Federal League began operating as a minor league in 1913, with the Kansas City Packers as a member and with home games being played on Gordon & Koppel Field, as the papers were calling it by then. Two members of the Gordon family were on the team's board of directors. The league declared itself a major league for 1914, and Kansas City continued as a league member for its two-year existence at major status. In 1914, the Packers finished in sixth place, 20 games back of first place. They fared better in 1915, finishing 5 1/2 games behind, but that was the end of it.

The ballfield was located on a block bound by The Paseo (east, left field?); 47th Street (north, third base?) (approximates Emanual Cleaver II Boulevard); Tracy Avenue (west, first base?); and Brush Creek (south, right field?). The diamond is thought (by Marc Okkonen) to have been in the northwest corner of the block, but there is room for some doubt, hence the question marks. Documentary evidence is scanty. The one known photo of the interior (see external links) appears to show The Paseo bridge behind third base, which would suggest the diamond would have been in the northeast corner.

The field was subject to flooding from the nearby Brush Creek, which occasionally wrought havoc with the games. After the Federal experiment, the site was soon abandoned. The last city directory entry for Gordon & Koppel Stadium is in the 1917 edition. The land once occupied by the ballpark is now a public park called Kiely Park, which also contains a few commercial businesses, primarily restaurants.

References

The Federal League of 1914-1915, by Marc Okkonen, SABR, 1989.

External links
Ballpark photo

Defunct baseball venues in the United States
Sports venues in Missouri
Federal League venues
Sports venues in Kansas City, Missouri
Defunct sports venues in Missouri